Eduardo Santos Alvite is Ecuadorian economist and retired diplomat.

Career
He joined the Ecuadorian Ministry for Foreign Affairs.
From 1976 to 1979 he was director of the National Board of Planification and Coordination.
From 1979-1981 he was Under Secretary of Economic Affairs, Ministry of Foreign Affairs.

From 1980 to 1982 he was ambassador in Montevideo and Permanent representative to the Latin American Integration Association

In 1984 he was Coordinator of the Economic Conference of Latin America in Ecuador and ambassador in Habana.
From 1988 to 1990 he was ambassador in Moscow (Soviet Union).
From 1990 to 1995 he was Ecuador's Permanent Representative next to the United Nations Office at Geneva.

Publications
with Mariana Mora Duque: Ecuador: La Ecuador since 1930.
 Ecuador en la década de los noventa, principales desafíos, Corporación Editora Nacional, 1993 - 86 p
El Ecuador al año 2000: sector agropecuario, forestal y pesquero, Quito, Corporación Editora Nacional/Conacyt, 1989, p.
 "La Pobreza en el Ecuador", del Econ. Eduardo Santos Alvite, 1993
Crimen contra el pulmón del mundo (THE CRIME AGAINST THE LUNG OF THE WORLD, THE AMAZON),

References 

Ambassadors of Ecuador to Uruguay
Ambassadors of Ecuador to Cuba
Ambassadors of Ecuador to Russia
Permanent Representatives of Ecuador to the United Nations
1940 births
Living people